Stamina may refer to:

Biology and healthcare
 Endurance, the ability of an organism to exert itself and remain active for a long period of time, as well as its ability to resist, withstand, recover from, and have immunity to trauma, wounds, or fatigue
 Stamen (plural: stamina), the male organ of a flower
 Stamina therapy, a controversial alternative medical treatment based on stem cells

Other uses
 Stamina (horse) (1905–1930), American racehorse
Stamina, a constraint system in a number of free-to-play video games that limits how often the player can attack, run, jump or exert energy

See also
 Stam1na, a Finnish heavy metal band